Richard J. Rose (born March 19, 1935) is an American psychologist and behavioral geneticist. He is Emeritus Professor of Psychological & Brain Sciences at Indiana University Bloomington and of Medical & Molecular Genetics at the Indiana University School of Medicine. He is also a visiting professor at the University of Helsinki in Finland. He received his Ph.D. from the University of Minnesota in 1964, where he was advised by David T. Lykken. A founding member of the Behavior Genetics Association, he served as its president in 1999 and received its Dobzhansky Award in 2007. He is known for his research using twins to study human behavioral traits such as alcoholism and IQ. This included working as a consultant on the Minnesota Study of Twins Reared Apart in the 1970s. He began collaborating with scientists at the University of Helsinki in 1984, and received an honorary doctorate from this university in 2009.

References

External links
Faculty page

1935 births
Living people
Indiana University Bloomington faculty
University of Minnesota alumni
Behavior geneticists
21st-century American psychologists
Academic staff of the University of Helsinki
American geneticists
20th-century American psychologists